Chalkwell Coaches is a bus and coach tour operator in Sittingbourne, Kent.

History

Chalkwell Coaches was founded in 1931 by Harry Eglington as Island Luxury Coaches. In April 1931 a short lived Sheerness to Stoke Newington service began. During World War II all seven coaches were requisitioned. In 1969, the business was taken over by Eglington's son Clyde.

In 1987, Chalkwell commenced its first local bus service from Doddington to Faversham. In 1990, it commenced operating services under contract to Kent County Council. In 1992, Chalkwell commenced operating Maidstone & District Motor Services day tour program.

In 1993, Downsway Coaches of Canterbury was acquired. In July 1993, it commenced operating commuter services from Sittingbourne to Central London.

On 12 July 2021, Chalkwell took over the operations of routes 360, 361 and 367 in Sheerness as a result of Arriva Southern Counties closing their depot in the town and handing the routes back to Kent County Council.

On 12 February 2023, most of the company's rural services in Sittingbourne, as well as the Sunday services in Sheerness were withdrawn as a result of funding for the routes being withdrawn by Kent County Council.

Services
As of February 2023, Chalkwell operate seven local bus services in the Swale area, centred around the towns of Sittingbourne and Sheerness. The company also operates a number of school services in both areas.

Chalkwell currently operate the following services (excluding school services):

Chalkwell Coaches operated commuter coach routes 780, 781, 782 and 784 from Bearsted and Kings Hill to the Tate Britain in London until May 2017 when the routes were withdrawn.

Fleet
As at May 2014, the fleet comprised 76 vehicles.

References

External links

Company website

Transport companies established in 1931
Transport in Kent
1931 establishments in England